Jone Usamate (born 2 April 1962, in Suva) is a Fijian politician, who served as the Minister for  Infrastructure and Meteorological Services from 2014 to 2022 and Minister for Lands and Mineral Resources from 2020 to 2022 in the Fijian government.

Usamate studied at the Suva Infant School, Veiuto Primary, Levuka Public and the then Kalabu Fijian before attending Lelean Memorial School from 1974 to 1979. He  studied at the University of the South Pacific and earned a Bachelor of Arts degree in administration and economics as well as a Master of Arts in management from Southern Cross University.
 
He was the chief executive officer for the Training and Productivity Authority of Fiji (TPAF) and was the Director for Technical and Vocational Education and Training at the Fiji National University.

In February 2012, he was appointed a Minister and sworn in by Fiji's President Ratu Epeli Nailatikau at Government House, Suva.

He stood for Fiji First in the 2014 general elections. He collected 939 votes and was elected as a Member of Parliament. He returned as a Government minister and left the Labour and Industrial Relations Ministry to become the Minister for Health. In September 2016, he was part of a cabinet shuffle and was moved to the Ministry for Employment Opportunities, Productivity and Industrial Relations.

References

External links
 Ministry of Labour profile

Living people
1962 births
Fijian civil servants
Government ministers of Fiji
FijiFirst politicians
I-Taukei Fijian members of the Parliament of Fiji
University of the South Pacific alumni
Academic staff of the Fiji National University
Southern Cross University alumni
Politicians from Suva